James Findlay (May 16, 1833 – July 23, 1923) was an Ontario newspaper owner and political figure. He represented Renfrew North in the House of Commons of Canada as a Liberal member from 1873 to 1874.

He was born in Châteauguay in Lower Canada in 1833, the son of Robert Findlay, a Scottish immigrant. He was owner and editor of the Pembroke Observer. Findlay was an unsuccessful candidate for a seat in the House of Commons in an 1869 by-election. He was defeated when he ran for reelection in 1878 and 1887. Findlay died in Pembroke at the age of 90.

References 

1833 births
1923 deaths
Liberal Party of Canada MPs
Members of the House of Commons of Canada from Ontario